Smiles Are Trumps is a 1922 American silent action film directed by George Marshall and starring Maurice 'Lefty' Flynn, Ora Carew and Herschel Mayall.

Cast
 Maurice 'Lefty' Flynn as 	Jimmy Carson
 Ora Carew as 	Marjorie Manning
 Miles McCarthy as John Slevin 
 Herschel Mayall as James Manning
 Kirke Lucas as 	Enrico
 C. Norman Hammond as 	Martino

References

Bibliography
 Connelly, Robert B. The Silents: Silent Feature Films, 1910-36, Volume 40, Issue 2. December Press, 1998.
 Munden, Kenneth White. The American Film Institute Catalog of Motion Pictures Produced in the United States, Part 1. University of California Press, 1997.
 Solomon, Aubrey. The Fox Film Corporation, 1915-1935: A History and Filmography. McFarland, 2011.

External links
 

1922 films
1920s action films
American silent feature films
American action films
American black-and-white films
Fox Film films
Films directed by George Marshall
1920s English-language films
1920s American films